Marie-Ève Pelletier (born May 18, 1982) is a Canadian former professional tennis player. She reached career-high rankings by the Women's Tennis Association (WTA) of 106 in singles on June 20, 2005 and 54 in doubles on April 12, 2010.

Tennis career

1998–2013
Marie-Ève played in one career Grand Slam singles match in 2004, at the Australian Open, qualifying for the tournament before losing in the first round to Akiko Morigami. She is the previous winner of two events on the ITF Women's Circuit, the 2000 Virginia Beach and 2005 Waikoloa tournaments. Her best result in a WTA Tour event came at the 2005 Hyderabad Open, where she reached the quarterfinals. The biggest win of her career was when she beat then-world No. 16, Li Na, in straight sets in the first round of the 2006 Rogers Cup. She won in June 2012 the third singles title of her career at the $25k tournament in El Paso, beating Ashley Weinhold in the final.

Pelletier retired from tennis on January 9, 2013, after her loss in the first round of the Australian Open qualifying.

Fed Cup
Marie-Ève was a regular on Canada's Fed Cup team, playing every year from 2002 to 2008 and again from 2010 to 2012. She amassed a singles record of 9–9 and a doubles record of 16–6 in Fed Cup play.

Life after tennis
Pelletier is now a tennis analyst for TVA Sports, a sports television network in Quebec. She also was a tennis analyst for RDS for the 2013 Rogers Cup and an assistant coach for Tennis Canada's National Training Centre in Montreal. Pelletier married former NHL goaltender Pascal Leclaire in July 2014 and gave birth to their daughter Zoé in May 2015.

ITF Circuit finals

Singles: 9 (3 titles, 6 runner-ups)

Doubles: 51 (25 titles, 26 runner-ups)

Performance timelines

Singles

Doubles

Record against top-100 players
Pelletier's win–loss record (9–53, 15%) against players who were ranked world No. 100 or higher when played is as follows: Players who have been ranked world No. 1 are in boldface.

 Li Na 1–0
 Chanelle Scheepers 1–0
 Jill Craybas 1–0
 Alina Jidkova 1–0
 Samantha Reeves 1–0
 Julia Schruff 1–0
 Tatiana Perebiynis 1–0
 Stéphanie Foretz 1–2
 Marissa Irvin 1–4
 Lindsay Davenport 0–1
 Jelena Janković 0–1
 Nadia Petrova 0–1
 Francesca Schiavone 0–1
 Marion Bartoli 0–1
 Sabine Lisicki 0–1
 Amy Frazier 0–1
 Anna Smashnova 0–1
 Virginie Razzano 0–1
 Fabiola Zuluaga 0–1
 Alexandra Stevenson 0–1
 Magüi Serna 0–1
 Barbora Strýcová 0–1
 Klára Koukalová 0–1
 Iveta Benešová 0–1
 Petra Cetkovská 0–1
 Tamira Paszek 0–1
 María Vento-Kabchi 0–1
 Kristina Brandi 0–1
 Sania Mirza 0–1
 Laura Granville 0–1
 Rachel McQuillan 0–1
 Petra Mandula 0–1
 María Sánchez Lorenzo 0–1
 Marie-Gaïané Mikaelian 0–1
 Marlene Weingärtner 0–1
 Melinda Czink 0–1
 Marta Domachowska 0–1
 Martina Suchá 0–1
 Ashley Harkleroad 0–1
 Shenay Perry 0–1
 Akiko Morigami 0–1
 Els Callens 0–1
 Adriana Gerši 0–1
 Jennifer Hopkins 0–1
 Anastasia Rodionova 0–1
 Yuliana Fedak 0–1
 Jana Nejedly 0–1
 Zsófia Gubacsi 0–1
 Séverine Beltrame 0–2
 Nuria Llagostera Vives 0–2
 Tatiana Poutchek 0–2
 Irina Selyutina 0–2

Notes

References

External links

1982 births
Living people
Canadian female tennis players
French Quebecers
People from Repentigny, Quebec
Racket sportspeople from Quebec
Sportspeople from Quebec City
Tennis players at the 2007 Pan American Games
Pan American Games competitors for Canada